Lakewood Airport  is a public use airport located three nautical miles (6 km) southeast of the central business district of Lakewood, in Ocean County, New Jersey, United States. The airport is owned by Lakewood Township. It is included in the National Plan of Integrated Airport Systems for 2011–2015, which categorized it as a general aviation facility.

The airport is home to the Pineland Composite Squadron of the Civil Air Patrol, unit number NER-NJ-096.

Facilities and aircraft 
Lakewood Airport covers an area of 192 acres (78 ha) at an elevation of 43 feet (13 m) above mean sea level. It has one runway designated 6/24 with an asphalt surface measuring 2,912 by 60 feet (888 x 18 m).

For the 12-month period ending February 2, 2012, the airport had 16,040 general aviation aircraft operations, an average of 43 per day. At that time there were 57 aircraft based at this airport: 94% single-engine, 4% multi-engine and 2% helicopter.

See also 
 List of airports in New Jersey

References

External links 
 Airport page at Lakewood Township website
 Lakewood Airport (N12) from New Jersey DOT Airport Directory
 Aerial image as of March 1995 from USGS The National Map
 

Airports in New Jersey
Transportation buildings and structures in Ocean County, New Jersey
Lakewood Township, New Jersey